The New Breed is an American crime drama series that aired on ABC from October 3, 1961, to June 5, 1962, with thirty-six episodes. The series was a QM Production in association with Selmur Productions, Inc.

Synopsis
The series stars Leslie Nielsen as the serious Lieutenant Price Adams who worked on "The Hot Shot Detail" of the LAPD's Metro Squad and former Major League Baseball player John Beradino as Sergeant Vince Cavelli. The script for the first episode, "No Fat Cops," was written by Hank Searls, credited as the creator of the series.  Searls also wrote an original novel based on the series under the pseudonym "Lee Costigan."

The New Breed was the first independent production of Quinn Martin under his newly established company, QM Productions. Prior to starting his own production company, Martin had produced The Untouchables for Desilu Productions, and Nielsen was cast for the role of Adams because of a guest appearance he had made on that program in the episode titled "Three Thousand Suspects." The show was scheduled against The Red Skelton Show and Ichabod and Me on CBS and The Dick Powell Show on NBC, and was canceled after one season.

Cast
 Leslie Nielsen as Lieutenant Price Adams
 John Beradino as Sergeant Vince Cavelli
 John Clarke as Patrolman Joe Huddleston (27 episodes)
 Byron Morrow as Captain Keith Gregory (2 episodes)
 Greg Roman as Patrolman Pete Garcia (2 episodes)
 Art Gilmore as Narrator

Notable guest stars

 Stanley Adams 
 Eddie Albert
 Martin Balsam
 Ed Begley
 Bea Benaderet
 Robert Blake
 Charles Bronson
 Victor Buono
 Yvonne Craig
 Ivan Dixon
 Jena Engstrom
 Peter Falk
 Peter Fonda
 Anne Francis
 Gloria Grahame
 James Gregory
 Joan Hackett
 Eileen Heckart
 Ron Howard
 Sherry Jackson
 Vivi Janiss
 Victor Jory
 Jack Klugman
 Cloris Leachman
 John Larch
 Tina Louise
 Strother Martin
 Patty McCormack
 Dina Merrill
 Vic Morrow
 Barry Morse
 Jack Oakie
 Simon Oakland
 Arthur O'Connell
 Nehemiah Persoff
 Barney Phillips
 Sydney Pollack
 Robert Redford
 Chris Robinson
 Telly Savalas
 William Schallert
 Joan Tompkins
 Fritz Weaver
 William Windom
 Keenan Wynn

Episodes

External links

 
 The New Breed on TVIV

1961 American television series debuts
1962 American television series endings
American Broadcasting Company original programming
1960s American crime drama television series
Black-and-white American television shows
Television series by CBS Studios
Fictional portrayals of the Los Angeles Police Department
English-language television shows
Television series by Selmur Productions
Television shows set in Los Angeles